Hamdi Kasraoui (born 18 January 1983) is a Tunisian former professional footballer who played as a goalkeeper. He is currently the goalkeeping coach of Tunisia.

Club career
Kasraoui played for Espérance Sportive de Tunis until 25 May 2009, when he signed with French club RC Lens, which at the time had just secured promotion back to the Ligue 1. He spent the 2009-10 season as the club's second-choice goalkeeper, behind Vedran Runje, making his Ligue 1 debut on 17 April 2010 in a goalless draw at OGC Nice after Runje was ruled out with an injury. After his debut, Kasraoui went on to appear in all of the club's remaining five league matches of the season.

Kasraoui decided to return to Tunisia in December 2012. Much appreciated in the northern club, Kasraoui announced his departure to his teammates leaving a message full of emotion in the locker room. For several days now, his signature in CS Sfaxien has been formalized by the Tunisian club on 20 December for a six-month contract. He won the Tunisian championship for the fourth time in his career.

He also signed a contract with Stade Tunisien in 2014 before joining CA Bizertin in 2015 where he remained 3 years before retiring in 2018.

International career
Kasraoui has 16 caps for the Tunisian national team, and played at the 2005 FIFA Confederations Cup hosted by Germany and the 2006 African Cup of Nations in Egypt. However, he has been the second-choice goalkeeper both on club and international level. He was called up to the 2006 World Cup as a reserve for Ali Boumnijel. After Boumnijel retired from international football, Kasraoui became the first choice goalkeeper for Tunisia in 2008 African Cup of Nations but he has not been as successful as its predecessor.

He retired internationally in 2012.

Coaching career
He made his debut in his managerial career on 4 August 2018 when he was appointed as a goalkeeping coach of Tunisia national team with the head coach Faouzi Benzarti.
On 2 August 2021, he was appointed as a goalkeeping coach of Espérance de Tunis.

References

External links

Hamdi Kasraoui – Official Website

1983 births
Living people
People from Sousse
Tunisian footballers
Association football goalkeepers
2005 FIFA Confederations Cup players
2006 FIFA World Cup players
2006 Africa Cup of Nations players
2008 Africa Cup of Nations players
Tunisia international footballers
Tunisian expatriate footballers
Espérance Sportive de Tunis players
RC Lens players
CS Sfaxien players
Stade Tunisien players
CA Bizertin players
Ligue 1 players
Association football goalkeeping coaches